Harvard Avenue is a light rail station on the MBTA Green Line B branch, located in the Allston neighborhood of Boston, Massachusetts. The station is located on the west side of Commonwealth Avenue at Harvard Avenue, in a residential and commercial district. The station consists of two side platforms, located on opposite sides of Harvard Avenue, which serve the B branch's two tracks. The station is fully accessible.

History

Harvard Avenue is the second-busiest surface stop on the Green Line surface branches (behind only Coolidge Corner), with an average of 4,077 boardings on weekdays. The high ridership is because the station is the primary rapid transit connection for much of Allston as well as the eastern portion of Brighton. Additionally, it is a major bus transfer station for the busy route 66 bus, a crosstown trunk route which also serves as a feeder route connecting Allston and Brookline to the subway system.

Due to its high ridership, Harvard Avenue was one of the first Green Line surface stops to be made accessible. In the early 2000s, the MBTA modified key surface stops with raised platforms for accessibility. Portable lifts were installed at Harvard Avenue around 2000 as a temporary measure. The platform modifications - part of a $32 million modification of thirteen B, C, and E branch stations - began in November 2001, with completion of the project in October 2002. Delays in construction caused cascading delays to similar renovations at Boston University East and Boston University Central. During the construction work, temporary platforms were constructed on the opposite side of Harvard Avenue from their usual configuration.

References

External links

MBTA – Harvard Avenue
Station from Harvard Avenue entrance from Google Maps Street View

Green Line (MBTA) stations
Railway stations in Boston